Jason Benjamin Grant,  a music historian, is most known for his work uncovering lost music by Telemann and Bach.

He studied at Bates College and then at the University of Pittsburgh, where he obtained his doctorate in 2005 with a dissertation entitled The rise of lyricism and the decline of biblical narration in the late liturgical passions of Georg Philipp Telemann.

He presented material from his dissertation at the 2003 meeting of the Wolfenbütteler Arbeitskreises für Barockforschung at the Herzog August Bibliothek in Wolfenbüttel, Germany.  Part or all of the dissertation was published as Passion, Affekt und Leidenschaft in der Frühen Neuzeit (Suffering, Emotion, and Passion in the Early Modern Period), Harrasowitz Verlag (Wiesbaden, 2005).

Following that, he was visiting assistant professor of music at the University of Pittsburgh.

During the 1990s, Jason Grant was known as an organist, with a special affinity for Baroque music.

Currently, Grant is an Editor-in-Residence of the Carl Philipp Emanuel Bach: The Complete Works for the Packard Humanities Institute.

Bibliography

References

Year of birth missing (living people)
Living people
American musicologists
American classical organists
American male organists
21st-century organists
21st-century American male musicians
21st-century American keyboardists
Male classical organists